Paradas is a municipality in the province of Seville, Spain.

References

Municipalities of the Province of Seville